Cigale or Cigales and La Cigale with the French definite article "la"  may refer to:

People
Matej Cigale (1819–1889), Slovene lawyer, linguist and editor

Places
Cigales, a municipality in Province of Valladolid, Spain
La Cigale, a famed theater at 120, boulevard de Rochechouart near Place Pigalle, in the 18th arrondissement of Paris
La Cigale (brasserie), a brasserie located in Nantes, France

Arts and entertainment
Cigale (ballet), a divertissement-ballet in two acts by Jules Massenet to a scenario by Henri Cainperformed first in 1904. The story is inspired by the fable The Grasshopper and the Ant

See also
Aubert Cigale (English: Cicada), a family of high-wing cabin monoplanes built in France in the years immediately before and immediately after World War II
La Cigale et la Fourmi, the French title of the fable The Ant and the Grasshopper
La cigale et la fourmi (English: The Grasshopper and the Ant), a three-act opéra comique with music by Edmond Audran and words by Henri Chivot and Alfred Duru. Loosely based on Jean de La Fontaine's version of Aesop's fable The Ant and the Grasshopper